An environmental health officer (EHO; also known as a public health inspector) is responsible for carrying out measures for protecting public health, including administering and enforcing legislation related to environmental health and providing support to minimize health and safety hazards. EHOs keep water, food, air, land, facilities, and other environmental factors (factors external to a person) safe of health hazards, whether biological, chemical, or physical. They also address the related factors that impact behaviours. EHOs assess and control environmental factors that can potentially affect health, to prevent disease and create health-supportive environments. Environmental determinants of health play a major role in a community's overall health and well-being, and thus EHOs are essential in improving population health outcomes and reducing the burden of disease. 

An environmental health practitioner (EHP) is trained to work to maintain a safe and healthy environment for the public. They are often required to have a degree and additional training, as well as be proficient in a variety of areas, including public health inspections, policy development, emergency response, disease prevention and control, and health promotion and education. EHPs may also be called EHOs and are responsible for preventing and addressing health risks, as well as educating the community on these issues.

EHPs have a deep understanding of fields such as microbiology, epidemiology, chemistry, toxicology, environmental science, and food science and are skilled in tracking and controlling communicable diseases and investigating environmental health incidents. They must also be familiar with relevant laws and regulations related to public health and safety. EHPs work with government agencies, local municipalities, businesses, and community groups to protect public health. Depending on the specific laws and definitions in their jurisdiction, they may also go by other titles, including environmental health specialist, public health inspector, and health official. Some past titles for this role include inspector of nuisances, sanitarian, and sanitary inspector.

Local, state, or federal health departments usually employ environmental health professionals to advise on and enforce public health standards. However, many are employed in the private sector, the military, and other third sector agencies such as charities and nongovernmental organisations.

Jobs
The following represents jobs that can be found in either the public or private sectors:
 Inspection and enforcement services
 Environmental health consulting and education
 Communicable disease investigations and outbreak control
 Contact tracing and case and contact management
 Food safety course training
 Community planning
 Sewage disposal (septic) systems planning
 Floor plan review and approval
 Housing standards/quality inspection and control
 Infection prevention and control (IPAC)
 Urban renewal 
 Pest control
 Emergency contingency planning and implementation
 Noise control
 Air quality monitoring
 Health and safety at work inspection and control
 Water protection and testing (drinking water and recreational water)
 Radon risk assessment in buildings
 Environmental sampling, analysis, and results interpretation
 Tobacco and vapour products control and reduction
 Community care facilities licensing
 Quality improvement

The common identifier of environmental health personnel is that they are responsible for the identification, evaluation, and management of risks to human health from factors in the environment, whether on behalf of government agencies or commercial and industrial concerns.

Roles
An EHO investigates health hazards in a wide variety of settings and will take action to mitigate or eliminate the hazards. Usually, the public perception of a health inspector is someone who examines restaurants and ensures they maintain sanitary standards for food safety set by the regulating authority. However, EHOs have much broader job duties, including inspecting swimming pools, substandard housing conditions, shelters, public schools, daycares, nursing homes, conveyances (e.g., cruise ships, ferries, airplanes, trains), and personal service establishments (e.g., tattoo parlours, tanning salons, beauty salons, laser hair removal facilities, barbershops). EHOs permit and inspect wells, private water systems, and individual subsurface sewage disposal (septic) systems. Other tasks include: campground inspections, special events inspections, waste management inspections, petting zoo inspections, correctional facility inspections, mobile home park inspections, and homeless encampment inspections. Trained in communicable disease control and prevention, during a disease outbreak they investigate and recommend/apply interventions to stop the spread of disease. Also trained in noncommunicable disease (NCD) prevention and control, they work to prevent NCDs and control risk factors. EHOs also plays a vital role in community projects such as those concerning health promotion, health equity, tobacco reduction, healthy built environments/healthy communities, food security, and emergency preparedness.

They may also respond to complaints such as animal bites (rabies control), garbage complaints, noise complaints, odor complaints, or sewage overflows. Due to their educational background and training they can provide information and referrals with regards to: lead, radon, mould, and emerging diseases (e.g., West Nile virus, avian influenza, COVID-19). The field also overlaps with hazardous materials (hazmat), and many hazmat responders are licensed environmental health practitioners or registered environmental health specialists. 

During a public health emergency such as a pandemic, they take on crucial emergency response roles, provide public education and advice, enforce public health orders, and take necessary actions to protect public health. Likewise, they respond to other emergencies such as natural disasters, with roles outlined in emergency response plans.

Working conditions
EHOs work with many different people in a variety of environments. Their jobs often involve considerable fieldwork, and some travel frequently. Many environmental health officers work long and often irregular hours. They inspect pools, childcare centers, restaurants, septic systems, and many other types of establishments that relate to health and safety.

EHOs may be exposed to many of the same physically strenuous conditions and hazards as industrial employees, and the work may be performed in unpleasant, stressful, and dangerous working conditions. They may find themselves in an adversarial role if the management of an organisation disagrees with the recommendations for ensuring a safe working environment.

History
In the Republic of Venice, at the beginning of the Renaissance, there was already a kind of court of health inspectors to contain the spread of epidemics. These individuals were appointed by the Venetian Senate and later by the Council of Ten.

During the early Industrial Revolution, under the Factory Act 1802, the magistrates assigned two local sanitary inspectors to oversee the sanitation of the factories, one was formerly a cleric and another a justice of the peace.

The field of environmental health can be traced back to the 1840s in England. Edwin Chadwick, a Poor Law Commissioner, conducted an inquiry into the causes of poverty which concluded that people often became poor because of ill health due to a bad environment. He believed that improving sanitation was the key to breaking this vicious cycle.

Chadwick led a vigorous campaign for change which eventually won over the establishment, resulting in the Public Health Act 1848. The act provided for the appointment of inspectors of nuisances—the forerunners of today's environmental health practitioners—in areas of need.

The Association of Public Sanitary Inspectors—the organization which was to become the United Kingdom's Chartered Institute of Environmental Health—was established in 1883. Over subsequent decades, the role of environmental health practitioners changed and grew, with standards of qualification rising until, in the 1960s, it became a graduate profession. The grant of a royal charter in 1984 set the seal on this enhanced role and status. As a result of changing roles, the titles have changed over the decades from inspector of nuisances to sanitary inspector to public health inspector / environmental health officer. This is also true internationally, as the titles have changed to reflect the advanced education and roles of environmental health officers today.

Inspector of nuisances
An inspector of nuisances was the title of an office in several English-speaking jurisdictions. In many jurisdictions, this term is now archaic, the position and/or term having been replaced by others. In the United Kingdom from the mid-19th century, this office was generally associated with public health and sanitation.

The first inspector of nuisances appointed by a UK local authority health committee was Thomas Fresh  in Liverpool in 1844. Both the Nuisances Removal and Diseases Prevention Act 1855 and the Metropolis Management Act 1855 defined such an office but with the title of 'Sanitary Inspector'. In local authorities that had established a board of health, the title was 'Inspector of Nuisances'. Eventually, the title was standardised across all UK local authorities as 'Sanitary Inspector'. An Act of Parliament in 1956 later changed the title to 'Public Health Inspector'. Similar offices were established across the British Empire and Commonwealth. The nearest modern equivalent of this position in the UK is an 'Environmental Health Officer'. This title being adopted by local authorities on the recommendation of Central Government after the Local Government Act 1972.

In the United States, a modern example of an officer with the title 'Inspector of Nuisances' but not the public health role is found in Section 3767[7] of the Ohio Revised Code which defines such a position to investigate nuisances, where this term broadly covers establishments in which lewdness and alcohol are found. Whereas the environmental health officer role in US local authorities is taken by officers with the titles 'Registered Environmental Health Specialist' or 'Registered Sanitarian' depending on the jurisdiction. The role in the US Public Health Service is undertaken by commissioned (uniformed) 'Environmental Health Officers'.

Qualifications
Environmental health is a graduate career in most countries. The minimum requirements in most countries include an approved university degree program, field training, and professional certification and registration.

Australia – General
Environmental Health Australia (EHA) accredits Australian Environmental Health Degree and Graduate Diploma programs in accordance with the Environmental Health Australia Accreditation Policy to ensure course content meets nationally consistent requirements for practice as an EHO anywhere in Australia. , there are EHA-accredited universities in every state and the Northern Territory.

Victoria, Australia
The current requirement to become an authorised officer under the Food Act 1984 in Victoria are defined by the Secretary of the Department of Health and Human Services. A range of undergraduate and graduate qualifications from Victoria, interstate and overseas are acceptable.

Western Australia
The Health Act 1911 (as amended) defines the role of 'environmental health officer' and empowers the Executive Director, Public Health to appoint EHOs to local government health authorities and as public health officials employed by state government. The Executive Director, Public Health is advised by the Western Australian Environmental Health Officers Professional Review Board on graduate and postgraduate qualifications that are deemed suitable to allow environmental health practice in Western Australia, and the qualifications are published from time to time in the Government Gazette.

Currently, Curtin University and Edith Cowan University offer environmental health degrees in Western Australia which are also accredited by EHA.

Canada
EHOs must hold at least a bachelor's degree in environmental health and a national professional certificate—the Certificate in Public Health Inspection (Canada) (CPHI(C)).

Certification and registration is regulated by the Canadian Institute of Public Health Inspectors (CIPHI). To become nationally certified, public health inspectors must complete an approved degree program, complete a field training practicum, and pass the Institute's Board of Certification examination (consisting of written reports and an oral examination). To maintain the CPHI(C) credential, practitioners must be registered with CIPHI and submit professional development hours annually.

Only six schools in Canada offer degree programmes approved by CIPHI as meeting the educational requirement for certification: British Columbia Institute of Technology, Cape Breton University, Concordia University of Edmonton, Conestoga College, Toronto Metropolitan University, and Université de Montréal. These programmes are generally four years long; however, fast-track programmes are available in some schools for those who have a previous science degree.

New Zealand
Entrants to the profession must have either a BAppSc Health Protection or BHSc Environmental Health. Alternatively, suitably qualified science graduates can obtain a graduate diploma in environmental health.

Ireland
To become an EHO, it is necessary to hold an environmental health degree approved by the Department of Health. The study of environmental health in Ireland also requires students to undertake a period of professional practice with the Health Service Executive. Following the period of professional practice, competence must then be demonstrated through an experiential learning logbook and oral examination.

Sri Lanka

United Kingdom
EHOs hold at least an undergraduate (or postgraduate) qualification recognised by (in England, Wales, and Northern Ireland) the Chartered Institute of Environmental Health. Similar provisions exist in Scotland, where the profession is regulated by The Royal Environmental Health Institute of Scotland.

Following the educational requirements and practical training period, competence must then be demonstrated through an experiential learning logbook and oral examination before registration is granted.

See also
Chief Green Officer (CGE)
Certified Public Health Inspector (Canada) - CPHI(C)
Public health
Environmental health
Occupational Safety and Health

References

External links
New Zealand Institute of Environmental Health
Chartered Institute of Environmental Health (England and Wales)
The Royal Environmental Health Institute of Scotland 
Canadian Institute of Public Health Inspectors
Irish Environmental Health Officers Association (Republic of Ireland)
International Federation of Environmental Health
Environmental Health Australia
Western Australia Environmental Health Officer Professional Review Board

Health care occupations
Environmental health